Kitana Kiki Rodriguez is an American actress. She is best known for her role as Sin-Dee Rella in Sean Baker's 2015 film Tangerine. The first Academy Award campaigns for openly transgender actresses supported by a film producer were launched for Rodriguez and Mya Taylor for Tangerine.

Filmography

Film

Television

References

External links

Transgender actresses
Living people
American LGBT actors
Hispanic and Latino American actresses
LGBT Hispanic and Latino American people
Year of birth missing (living people)